The Šavnik (Montenegrin: Шавник) is a river in Montenegro. It originates in northern Montenegro below Mount Pogledina.

Flowing through the town of Šavnik, it is one of the tributaries of the Bukovica within the Black Sea drainage basin.

References

Rivers of Montenegro